Gabriel Akinbolarin Akinbiyi  (b 5 December 1949) was the  Bishop of Akoko in the Anglican Province of Ondo in the Church of Nigeria until 2019.

He graduated from Immanuel College of Theology, Ibadan in 1981, Oak Hill College in London in 1990, and from King's College London in 1991 with a Masters in Theology.

He was made a Canon in 1993 and Archdeacon in 1994. In 1998 he became the Bishop of Offa; in July 2008 he was translated to the Bishop of Akoko.

In 2018 he was elected as Archbishop of Ondo.

References

Living people
Anglican bishops of Akoko
21st-century Anglican bishops in Nigeria
Year of birth missing (living people)
Alumni of Immanuel College of Theology, Ibadan
Alumni of King's College London
Alumni of Oak Hill College
Anglican bishops of Offa
Anglican archbishops of Ondo
Church of Nigeria archdeacons